Thomas Yaya Nimely (born 1956) is a politician in Liberia. In 2003 he became the leader of the Movement for Democracy in Liberia (MODEL), which soon became Liberia's second largest rebel group. Following the exile of President Charles Taylor, Nimely led his group into the transitional government which was formed on 14 October 2003. He then served as the foreign minister of Liberia until February 2006, when the elected President Ellen Johnson Sirleaf took office and established her new cabinet.

See also
Second Liberian Civil War

References

1956 births
Foreign Ministers of Liberia
Living people